José Antonio Villarreal (30 July 1924 – 13 January 2010) was an American Chicano novelist. Villarreal was born in 1924 in Los Angeles, California, to migrant Mexican farmworkers. Like Juan Manuel Rubio in Pocho, Villarreal's father fought with Pancho Villa in the Mexican Revolution. He spent four years in the Navy before attending the University of California at Berkeley in 1950.

Pocho
Villarreal's novel Pocho (1959) is one of the first Chicano novels, and the first to gain widespread recognition. Pocho has been called the "pivotal transitional link between 'Mexican American' and 'Chicano' literature", both because of its strengths as a novel and because of its use in the rediscovery and recuperation of Latino literature in the 1970s. The novel details the childhood of Richard Rubio, whose father Juan Manuel left Mexico in the post-Revolution exodus of 1910. As a first-generation American, Richard struggles with the conflicting values of his parents: his father's Mexican sense of honor, tradition, pride and masculinity and the more Americanized view of family and women's roles that his mother and especially his sisters adopt. Richard's father harbors a dream to return his family to Mexico, but his circumstances and choices keep him in the United States. Similarly, Richard does well in school and wants to go to college to become a writer, but he must become the man of the house after his father leaves the family; yet Richard himself leaves the family to join the Navy after Pearl Harbor. According to scholar Francisco A. Lomelí, the novel argues "that people of Mexican descent have a rightful place they can claim their own that is both Mexican and Anglo American, which Chicanos synthesize in varying degrees [and] accentuates, for the first time in a mainstream American literary scene, Hispanic characters as complex and multidimensional who, despite their individual flaws, possess depth and credibility".

Works
Fiction
 "Some Turn to God," short story, Pegasus, 1947
 "A Pot of Pink Beans Boiling," short story, San Francisco Review, 1959
 POCHO, a novel, Doubleday & Company, New York, 1959
 POCHO, reprint, Anchor Books, New York 1971
 "The Conscripts," short story, Puerto del Sol, 1973
 THE FIFTH HORSEMAN, a novel of the Mexican Revolution, Doubleday & Company, New York, 1974
 THE FIFTH HORSEMAN, Second edition, The Bilingual Press/Editorial Bilingue, State University of N.Y., Binghamton, 1984
 POCHO, New Edition, in Anchor Literary Series, Anchor Books, Doubleday & Company, New York, 1984
 CLEMENTE CHACON, novel, Bilingual Press/Editorial Bilingue, State University of N.Y., Binghamton,1984
 TWO SKETCHES: "The Last Minstrel in California," and "The Laughter of My Father," Iguana Dreams, ed. Delia Poey and Virgil Suarez, Harper-Collins, 1992
 POCHO, Spanish Language edition, transl. Roberto Cantu, Anchor Books, N.Y. 1994

Articles
  "The Fires of Revolution," Holiday Magazine, 1965
  "California: "The Mexican Heritage," Holiday Magazine, 1965
  "Mexican-Americans in Upheaval," West Magazine of the Los Angeles Times, September 1966
  "Mexican-Americans and the Leadership Crisis," West Magazine, September 1966
  "Olympics, 1968, "Mexico's Affair of Honor," Empire Magazine, Denver Post, April 1968

References

See also 

List of Mexican American writers

American writers of Mexican descent
1924 births
2010 deaths
20th-century American novelists
American male novelists
Hispanic and Latino American novelists
20th-century American male writers